Lunovula superstes is a species of sea snail, a marine gastropod mollusk in the family Ovulidae, one of the families of cowry allies.

Description
The length of the shell attains 11.7 mm.

Distribution
This marine species occurs off New Caledonia.

References

 Lorenz F. & Fehse D. (2009) The living Ovulidae. A manual of the families of allied cowries: Ovulidae, Pediculariidae and Eocypraeidae. Hackenheim: Conchbooks

External links
 Dolin, L. (1991). Mollusca Gastropoda: Cypraeopsis superstes sp. nov., Pediculariinae relique du bathyal de Nouvelle-Calédonie et de la Réunion in A. Crosnier & P. Bouchet (eds), Résultats des Campagnes MUSORSTOM, Volume 7 Mémoires du Muséum National d'Histoire Naturelle (A)150: 179-186

superstes
Gastropods described in 1991